Baltimore Country Club is a private club in Baltimore, Maryland, with two campuses, one in the city's Roland Park neighborhood and the other in the north suburb of Lutherville. It is one of only twelve clubs nationwide to operate two campuses. The club was founded on January 13, 1898, and hosted the U.S. Open the following year. Its original golf course at the Roland Park campus was the first 18-hole course built in the state of Maryland. The USGA lists Baltimore Country Club as one of the first 100 clubs established in the United States.

The club has hosted a U.S. Open, a PGA Championship, a Walker Cup, a U.S. Men's Amateur, a U.S. Women's Open, and a Senior PGA Tour Major - one of only two clubs in the country to do so. In addition to its two golf courses, BCC operates outdoor tennis, pickleball, platform tennis, single & doubles squash, three swimming pools, a duckpin bowling alley, two fitness centers, and dining at both clubhouses. In 2013, Links magazine named Baltimore Country Club as one of the 100 Most Prestigious Clubs in the World. Its East Course at the Five Farms location was ranked 75th best course in the United States by Golf Magazine in 2020. The club was also named in 2020 a Platinum Country Club in America and was ranked 47th.

History
The club opened in 1898 in its  Roland Park location with a membership of approximately 1,000. Just one year after opening, the Club hosted the fifth United States Open Championship, which was won by Willie Smith of Scotland. By the 1920s the decision was made to acquire land to the north of the city and expand the popular golfing amenities to a second location. The East Course at Five Farms, designed by A. W. Tillinghast, officially opened in September 1926. Two years later, this new course held the 1928 PGA Championship.

In October 1930, the Roland Park Clubhouse sustained fire damage, and prior to completing repairs, it was virtually destroyed by a second fire on January 5, 1931. The new “in-town” Clubhouse was formally opened on April 1, 1932. The Federal-style detailing of the Georgian Room, the paneling and black Belgian marble of the foyer, and the rough stone and pine of the Grille remain practically unchanged to this date. The duckpin bowling lanes were built in 1932 and remain in use today. During the late 1930s and early 1940s the grass tennis courts at Roland Park were selected by the National Lawn Tennis Association to host the qualifying rounds for the Davis Cup matches. Teams from Australia, Cuba, Japan, Mexico, Spain, and the United States all participated. The Roland Park Golf Course was officially closed in 1962 when all of the property on the west side of Falls Road was sold. That same year, the West Course at Five Farms opened. Two years later, the stately Olivier Mansion, which served as the original Five Farms Clubhouse, was demolished and replaced with a new building.

Squash courts, now international, were added to the Roland Park facility in 1963. The Club continues to host professional squash tournaments. The Club expanded its racquets program and added paddle tennis courts to the Roland Park campus in 1976. The club's swim complex was first built circa 1960. Renovations began some thirty years later, and the current facility, consisting of three independent pools, opened at Five Farms in 1996. New tennis courts, also at Five Farms, debuted in 2007.

Starting in the fall of 2021, the clubhouse at Five Farms underwent a major renovation. The renovation included remodeled nearly all of the first floor of the building, expanding the grill, adding a formal dining room, outdoor covered bar area and a rooftop bar. It opened in late summer of 2022.

Golf courses and rankings
Its current golf facility at Five Farms has two courses, the East Course and the West Course. Its East Course was designed by A. W. Tillinghast in 1926. In 2015, Keith Foster was brought in to restore the course. He removed trees, realigned the bunkers, upgraded the greens complexes, and re-grassed the fairways. The East Course has received numerous accolades and still enjoys praise from numerous golf organizations:

Notable Golf Tournaments

In Popular Culture
 The Netflix show, House of Cards used the Roland Park clubhouse for filming.

References

External links

1898 establishments in Maryland
Golf clubs and courses in Maryland
Lutherville, Maryland
Organizations based in Baltimore
Roland Park, Baltimore
Sports venues completed in 1898
Sports venues in Baltimore
Walker Cup venues